Francesca Sanna Sulis (1716-1810), was an Italian businessperson.

She was the inventor of the traditional women's silk cap known as cambussciu. Catherine the Great was among her costumers.

She founded the charitable insitutition in Quartucciu on Sardinia. 

The public library in Quartucciu, as well as the Museum of women entrepreneurs (MIF) in Muravera has been named after her.

References

1716 births
1810 deaths
18th-century businesswomen
18th-century Italian businesspeople
18th-century Italian women
19th-century businesswomen
19th-century Italian businesspeople
19th-century Italian women